The Sharamurunian age is a period of geologic time (48.6–37.2 Ma) within the Middle Eocene epoch of the Paleogene used more specifically with Asian Land Mammal Ages. It follows the Irdinmanhan age and precedes the Ulangochuian age.

The upper boundary layer of the Sharamurunian can be the approximate lower base of the Lutetian age.

The Sharamurunian age is named after the Sharamurun River in China.

Eocene